The 1904 Glamorgan County Council election was the sixth contest for seats on this authority in south Wales. It was preceded by the 1901 election and followed by the 1907 election. Glamorgan was by far the largest county in Wales in terms of population. Glamorgan County Council had been established by the Local Government Act 1888, the first elections being held in early 1889.

Overview of the result
As in most parts of Wales, the Liberal Party was once again triumphant and won a majority of the seats. In 1904 the majority of the seats were uncontested, in contrast to the position at previous elections.

Results are drawn from a number of sources. They include a number of newspapers.

Boundary changes
There were no boundary changes at this election.

Retiring aldermen
Eight of the eleven retiring aldermen were Liberals.

Contested elections

In the Rhondda district, the local paper stated that 'no truer manifestation of good faith and respect for the retiring County Councillors could have been shown than that eight of them were returned unopposed.' There were only two contested elections in the valley.

Results

Aberaman

Aberavon
John Morgan Smith held on to the seat he had held since 1889 by a mere two votes. At previously elections he had described himself both as a Conservative and Independent and had been returned unopposed on several occasions.

Aberdare Town
Retiring alderman J.W. Evans was returned unopposed. Retiring councillor David Hughes did not stand.

Barry
J.C. Meggitt stood down after fifteen years.

Blaengwawr

Cadoxton
This was a contest in which the controversy over the education rate featured and the sitting member, a Roman Catholic, was defeated by the clerk of the former School Board.

Bridgend

Briton Ferry
Jenkin Hill recaptured the seat he lost three years previously.

Caeharris

After fifteen years, Edward P. Martin, managing director of Guest, Keen and Nettlefolds decided not to seek re-election but was replaced as candidate by Henry W. Martin, general manager of the company. A 'large deputation of tradespeople and workmen' was reported to have pressed him to stand.

Caerphilly

Cilfynydd

Coedffranc

Coity

Cowbridge

Cwmavon
Two Liberals, a sitting alderman and sitting councillor, opposed each other.

Cyfarthfa
Thomas Thomas recaptured the seat he lost three years previously.

Cymmer

Dinas Powys

Dowlais

Dulais Valley

Ferndale

Gadlys
Griffith George, who had previously served on the Aberdare School Board and Aberdare Urban District Council had been invited to contest the seat three years previously but had declined. Parker then stood and came within 41 votes of victory.  There was some criticism of George for opposing Parker at this election but he held on to win by 96 votes.

Garw Valley

Gellifaelog

Gelligaer

Gower

Kibbor

Llandaff

Llandeilo Talybont

Llansamlet

Llantrisant

Llwydcoed
Rees Llewellyn was again returned unopposed.

Llwynypia and Clydach
James Evans, grocer, elected following Richard Lewis's election as alderman in 1901, was returned unopposed.

Lougher and Penderry

Maesteg
The same two candidates had faced each other in 1895. On that occasion, Barrow had won and was elected as alderman for a three-year period. Jenkin Jones was then returned at a by-election.

Margam

Merthyr Town

Merthyr Vale

Morriston

Mountain Ash

Neath (North)

Neath (South)
At the previous election, Trick had stood as a Conservative.

Newcastle
T.J. Hughes, first elected in 1889, had served as an alderman since 1898.

Ogmore

Ogmore Valley

Oystermouth

Penarth North

Penarth South

Penrhiwceiber

Pentre
E.T. Davies, auctioneer, had been elected at a by-election following Elias Henry Davies's appointment as alderman in 1902. He was now returned unopposed.

Penydarren

Pontardawe

Plymouth

Pontlottyn

Pontypridd
The seat was now known as Pontypridd and Rhondda

Penygraig
Penygraig appears to be a new ward.

Porth

Resolven

Sketty
John Davies had been defeated in the two previous elections but was now returned unopposed.

Swansea Valley

Treforest
James Roberts had won the seat at a by-election following the death of the previous member, David Leyshon

Treherbert
Enoch Davies, returned in 1901 following William Morgan's re-election as alderman, was elected unopposed.

Treorchy
Thomas Jones, Co-operative stores manager, was returned unopposed.

Trealaw and Tonypandy
D.W. Davies, the member since 1898, was returned unopposed for the second successive election.

Tylorstown and Ynyshir
Sitting councillor Dr T.H. Morris stood down to allow Alderman W.H. Mathias to be returned unopposed.

Ystalyfera

Ystrad
Clifford Cory, the member since 1892, was once again returned unopposed.

Election of aldermen

In addition to the 66 councillors the council consisted of 22 county aldermen. Aldermen were elected by the council, and served a six-year term. Following the 1904 election, there were eleven Aldermanic vacancies.

The following aldermen were appointed by the newly elected council.

elected for six years

Notes

References

Bibliography

1904
1904 Welsh local elections